Jolana Matoušková née Davidková (born 1979) is a retired Czech para table tennis player who competed in international level events. She is remembered as one of Czech Republic's most successful para table tennis player by winning five Paralympic medals, three-time World champion and seven-time European champion. 

Matoušková narrowly missed defending her singles title in 2004 when she was defeated by Natalia Partyka who was her main rival during her sporting career.

References

1979 births
Living people
Sportspeople from Plzeň
Paralympic table tennis players of the Czech Republic
Table tennis players at the 1996 Summer Paralympics
Table tennis players at the 2000 Summer Paralympics
Table tennis players at the 2004 Summer Paralympics
Medalists at the 1996 Summer Paralympics
Medalists at the 2000 Summer Paralympics
Medalists at the 2004 Summer Paralympics
Czech female table tennis players